Keeth Thomas Smart (born July 29, 1978) is a US sabre fencer who became the first American to gain the sport's top ranking for males. He was awarded a silver medal at the 2008 Olympic Games in Beijing.

Early life and education
Smart was born in Brooklyn, New York and grew up in Flatbush, Brooklyn, New York City. His parents were Thomas R. Smart Jr. (a production manager and later an economist) and Liz Smart (a teacher). At the urging of his parents, he and his younger sister Erinn began to learn fencing at the Peter Westbrook Foundation, whose founder, Olympic sabre bronze-medalist Peter Westbrook, was his mentor.

Smart graduated from Brooklyn Technical High School in 1996. He graduated from St. John's University in New York, majoring in finance. He received his MBA from Columbia University in 2010 and now works as the
Regional GM for Chelsea Piers Fitness.
.

Fencing career
During college, he was the NCAA sabre champion in 1997 and 1999, and took second place in 2001.

He was a member of the 1999 Pan American Games bronze medal team. He has competed in three Olympic Games.  In the individual Olympic men's sabre competition, he placed 30th in the 2000 Olympic Games, 15th in 2004, 4th in the team event, 6th in 2008, and he won the silver medal in the team event. His sister Erinn also earned a silver medal at the 2008 Olympics.

In 2002 and 2004, Smart won the US national sabre championship. In 2003, he became the first American to be named the top-ranked fencer internationally.

Personal life
Keeth married Shyra (Cooper) Smart on May 27, 2007 in Chapel Hill, North Carolina. They live in Brooklyn, NY with their two children.
Keeth and his sister Erinn are actively involved in the Peter Westbrook Foundation in New York.

See also
 List of American sabre fencers
List of USFA Division I National Champions

References

1978 births
Living people
St. John's University (New York City) alumni
Columbia Business School alumni
American male sabre fencers
Fencers at the 2000 Summer Olympics
Fencers at the 2004 Summer Olympics
Fencers at the 2008 Summer Olympics
Olympic silver medalists for the United States in fencing
Sportspeople from New York City
African-American sportsmen
Medalists at the 2008 Summer Olympics
Brooklyn Technical High School alumni
Pan American Games medalists in fencing
Pan American Games bronze medalists for the United States
Fencers at the 1999 Pan American Games
St. John's Red Storm fencers
Medalists at the 1999 Pan American Games
21st-century African-American sportspeople
20th-century African-American sportspeople